Coney Bay is a natural bay on the island of Newfoundland in the province of Newfoundland and Labrador, Canada. It is east of Otter Bay.

References

Bays of Newfoundland and Labrador